Allan Turner Howe (September 6, 1927 – December 14, 2000) was a U.S. Representative from Utah.

Born in South Cottonwood near Murray, Utah, Howe attended public schools before receiving a B.S. from the University of Utah in 1952 and a J.D.L. from the same university in 1954. He served in the United States Coast Guard from 1946 to 1947.

He held a number of legal and governmental jobs, including as deputy Salt Lake County attorney, South Salt Lake city attorney, administrative assistant and field representative to U.S. Senator Frank E. Moss from 1959 to 1964, assistant attorney general of Utah from 1965 to 1966, administrative assistant to Governor Cal Rampton from 1966 to 1968, and executive director of the Four Corners Regional Development Commission from 1968 to 1972. He also practiced law in Salt Lake City, served as a delegate to Utah State Democratic conventions from 1954 to 1960 and was an alternate delegate to the 1960 Democratic National Convention.

Howe was elected as a Democrat to the Ninety-fourth Congress in 1974.

Arrest
On June 13, 1976, Howe was arrested in Salt Lake City on misdemeanor charges of soliciting sex for hire after propositioning a police officer posing undercover as a prostitute. As a member of the Church of Jesus Christ of Latter-day Saints representing a district where most voters were members of the church, and amidst a rash of other congressional scandals in the summer of 1976, Howe had maintained that politicians' private moral behavior was relevant to their public service. Howe claimed that he was innocent, a victim of a politically motivated "set-up."

He retained the endorsement of local Democratic officials, but he faced a co-endorsed Democratic write-in challenger, and he ultimately lost reelection to Republican Dan Marriott in November 1976.

He was convicted of solicitation, and the conviction was upheld on appeal. Following his electoral defeat, Howe stayed in Washington, D.C. and worked as a lobbyist, including, at the end of his career, for the National Park and Hospitality Association.

See also 
 List of federal political sex scandals in the United States

References

External links 

 Congressional Bad Boys profile

1927 births
2000 deaths
Latter Day Saints from Utah
Democratic Party members of the United States House of Representatives from Utah
People from Salt Lake County, Utah
Military personnel from Utah
Utah lawyers
United States Coast Guard enlisted
University of Utah alumni
S.J. Quinney College of Law alumni
20th-century American lawyers
20th-century American politicians